was a Japanese novelist.  She was the daughter of Kazuo Hirotsu.

Biography
After her father died, Hirotsu wrote , which won the Toshiko Tamura award in 1972.  She also wrote , which won the Women's Literature award in 1981.  She wrote fewer works than her father Kazuo and her grandfather Hirotsu Ryurō.  Momoko, who never married, died childless.  She was buried at Yanaka Cemetery.

References

1918 births
1988 deaths
20th-century Japanese novelists
Japanese women novelists
20th-century women writers